Galpin Lake is a lake in Hennepin County, Minnesota, in the United States. The northern part of the lake is in Excelsior and the southern part is in Shorewood.

Galpin Lake was named for Charles Galpin, a local pastor.

See also
List of lakes in Minnesota

References

Lakes of Minnesota
Lakes of Hennepin County, Minnesota